Justin Maas is a Canadian realist artist and author.  Maas' first book "Drawing Realistic Pencil Portraits Step by Step: Basic Techniques for the Head and Face"  was published by F + W (now Penguin Random House). He has written articles for many art Magazines including The Artist's Magazine (July/Aug 2019) and The Pastel Journal (October 2019)  Maas was born in Hartford, Connecticut and currently resides in Salmon Arm, British Columbia

Education 
Maas studied briefly at the Art Institute of Chicago and the Milwaukee Art Museum before enrolling in the Visual Communications Program at the Alberta College of Art and Design where he received a 4 year diploma.

Maas is a Senior Signature Member of the Federation of Canadian Artists and an Elected Member of the Society of Canadian Artists

Awards 

 2019 Awarded Senior Signature Member status with the Federation of Canadian Artists

2018  1st Place - 2018 Star Wars Awards "Best Traditional Art" in Visual Art Category"  
 2018   2nd Place - Federation of Canadian Artists Chapter Show   

 2017   2nd Place - Federation of Canadian Artists National Show  
 2017   2nd Place - Federation of Canadian Artists Chapter Show  
 2017   Award of Excellence - Federation of Canadian Artists National Works on Paper Show
 2017   Marie Manson Award Recipient

 2016   1st Place - Federation of Canadian Artists COC Chapter Show  
 2016   1st Place - Federation of Canadian Artists National Show   
 2016   2nd Place - Federation of Canadian Artists Chapter Show  
 2016  Award of Excellence - Federation of Canadian Artists National Works on Paper Show - January 2016 

 2015   1st Place - Federation of Canadian Artists TNSC Chapter Show  
 2015   2nd Place - Federation of Canadian Artists COC Chapter Show

 2014   3rd Place - Federation of Canadian Artists COC National Show  
 2014   Award of Excellence - Federation of Canadian Artists TNSC Chapter Show  

 2012 - 2nd Place - Federation of Canadian Artists TNSC Chapter Show

Works 
Maas' works are in private collections across Canada, The United States and Europe.   As well, he has several famous clients including Actors, Actresses and Musicians.

Maas' has done a series of features for Strathmore Artists Papers, specifically their Toned Tan line.

Maas' drawing of Ken Jeong was featured on  Today (U.S. TV program)

References

External links 

 LA Magazine Interview
 Voyage Chicago Interview
 Signature Members, Federation of Canadian Artists
 Strathmore Artists Papers 2019 Summer Featured Artist
 Strathmore Artists Papers
 Vernon Morning Star
 Penticton Western News
 Maas Art Website

1972 births
Living people
People from Hartford, Connecticut
People from Salmon Arm
Artists from British Columbia